Didžioji Riešė is a village and administrative centre of Riešė eldership, Vilnius District Municipality, Lithuania. At the 2011 census, the village had a population of 2,520. That was an increase from the 2001 census which recorded the population of 1,142.

History 
During the Soviet occupation, it was a central settlement of a Soviet farm.

In 2017, the official coat-of-arms was authorized.

References

Villages in Vilnius County
Vilnius District Municipality